James Miller was an American politician who served as the Mayor of Newark from 1838 to 1840 and from 1848 to 1851.

References

Mayors of Newark, New Jersey
New Jersey Whigs
19th-century American politicians
Place of birth missing
Place of death missing
Year of birth missing
Year of death missing